Federal Polytechnic, Oko is a Nigerian polytechnic located in Oko, Anambra State. It was founded in 1979, and was previously known as the College of Arts, Science and Technology.

Federal Polytechnic, Oko is one of is developing tertiary institutions in Nigeria. It has functional memoranda of understanding with different universities within and outside the country.

On February 4, 2019, Federal Polytechnic Oko had its first female substantive Rector, Dr. Francisca Unoma Nwafulugo. She was a Chief lecturer at the Department of Chemical Engineering, Kaduna Polytechnic.

Faculties 
Presently, there are 8 academic faculties in the polytechnic.

School of Engineering Technology 
 Civil Engineering
 Mechanical Engineering
 Electrical Electronics Engineering
 Agricultural Engineering
 Computer Engineering
 Agricultural Technology
 Chemical Engineering

School of Environmental Design and Technology 
 Architecture
 Building Technology
 Estate Management
 Urban and Regional Planning
 Quantity Surveying
 Surveying and Geo-informatics

School of Applied Science and Technology 
 Science Laboratory Technology
 Home and Rural Economics
 Food Technology
 Mathematics and Statistics
 Hospitality Management and Tourism
 Computer Science

School of Arts, Design and Printing Technology 
 Fashion Design & Clothing Technology
 Printing Technology
 Fine and Applied Arts

School of Business Studies 
 Business Administration & Management
 Public Administration
 Office Technology and Management
 Marketing
School of Information Technology
 Mass Communication
 Library and Information Science

School of Financial Studies 
 Accountancy
 Banking and Finance
 Insurance

School of General Studies 
 Natural Science
 Social Science
 Languages

Campus 
The Polytechnic has three campuses.

 The main campus is at Oko which occupies a total land area of 89 hectares.
 Ufuma campus occupies a total land area of 52 hectares.
Atani campus has a total area of 40 hectares.

References

External links 
 

Federal polytechnics in Nigeria
Education in Anambra State